The Greater St. Louis Golf Classic was a golf tournament on the PGA Tour in 1972 and 1973. It was played at the Norwood Hills Country Club in Normandy, Missouri.

In 1972, Lee Trevino made birdie on the first two holes Sunday to take over the lead from future PGA Tour Commissioner Deane Beman and eventually beat him by one shot.

In 1973, Gene Littler won by one shot over Bruce Crampton. Sixteen months previously, Littler had been operated on for cancer of the lymph gland.

Winners

References

Former PGA Tour events
Golf in Missouri
Sports in St. Louis